Dixie is an unincorporated community and census-designated place (CDP) in Brooks County, Georgia, United States. Dixie has a post office with ZIP code 31629.

It was first listed as a CDP in the 2020 census with a population of 121.

History
Dixie had its start in 1861 when the railroad was extended to that point. The community was named from Dixie, a nickname for the southeastern United States. A post office called Dixie has been in operation since 1879. The Georgia General Assembly incorporated the place in 1908 as the "Town of Dixie". The town's municipal charter was dissolved in 1995.

Demographics

2020 census

Note: the US Census treats Hispanic/Latino as an ethnic category. This table excludes Latinos from the racial categories and assigns them to a separate category. Hispanics/Latinos can be of any race.

References

Former municipalities in Georgia (U.S. state)
Unincorporated communities in Brooks County, Georgia
Unincorporated communities in Georgia (U.S. state)
Populated places disestablished in 1995